Ehsaan Noorani is an Indian composer and guitarist.

Music career
Noorani is the part of the Shankar–Ehsaan–Loy trio, which consist of Shankar Mahadevan, Loy Mendonsa and himself. He was the guitarist for many music directors before he himself started composing music. Ehsaan studied music with Mr. Bismarck Rodrigues, an experienced guitar teacher from Mumbai (Bombay).
Ehsaan studied music at the Musicians Institute in Hollywood, California from 1985 to 1986 . Ehsaan is the first guitarist from India to be endorsed by Fender guitars and has a Squier signature model to his name. He also endorses Fractal Audio and D'Addario strings . His playing is strongly influenced by players like Robben Ford, BB King, Larry Carlton, etc.

In 2015, Noorani was a co judge in India's first Western reality show called The Stage produced by Viacom and aired on Colours Infinity.
 In recent COVID-19  times, Ehsaan is credited for promoting large number of Indian artists through his Instagram live sessions and thereby providing a platform for budding musicians in India to collaborate and make music. The Instagram group e_fam __ features a lot of these artists .

Instruments and effects
Noorani is most notably associated with using the Squier Stratocaster guitar and is endorsed by the Fender family of brands. In 2011 Squier released the Ehsaan Noorani Signature Stratocaster which included several custom features such as a HSH pickup configuration and exclusive colors.  Ehsaan is also endorsed by Neunaber Audio and currently uses an Immerse Reverberator pedal. In March 2015 Vertex effects shared photos of a custom pedal board they assembled for Ehsaan which featured several guitar effects such as a Strymon Flint, a Maxon OD-9 Overdrive, and a WEEHBO Dumbledore.

Awards and nominations

These awards are all with the trio Shankar–Ehsaan–Loy

National Film Awards, India
 2004: Best Music Direction win for Kal Ho Naa Ho

IIFA Awards
 2004: Best Music Direction win for Kal Ho Naa Ho
 2006: Best Music Direction win for Bunty aur Babli
 2014: IIFA Award for Best Background Score "win" for Bhaag Milkha Bhaag
"2015: IIFA Best Music Director Award for 2 States

Filmfare Awards
 2001: Best Music Direction nomination for Dil Chahta Hai
 2001: RD Burman Award for New Music Talent win for Dil Chahta Hai
 2003: Best Music Direction win for Kal Ho Naa Ho
 2005: Best Music Direction win for Bunty Aur Babli
 2015: Best Music Direction win for 2 States

Star Screen Awards
 2000: Best Background Music nomination for Mission Kashmir
 2001: Best Music Direction win for Dil Chahta Hai
 2005: Best Music Direction win for Bunty aur Babli

Zee Cine Awards
 2006: Best Music Director win for Bunty aur Babli

Music composition and filmography

References

External links

 
 Shankar–Ehsaan–Loy official website
 

1963 births
Living people
Indian film score composers
Musicians Institute alumni
Cathedral and John Connon School alumni